Anthony Begina (born 1954) is a Dutch politician, who served as the Minister Plenipotentiary of Curaçao from June 2017 until June 2021.

Begina had previously served as Deputy Minister Plenipotentiary of Curaçao since 27 January 2016.

References 

Living people
1954 births
Ministers plenipotentiary (Curaçao)
Curaçao politicians